Brundall is a village and civil parish in the English county of Norfolk. It is located on the north bank of the River Yare opposite Surlingham Broad and about 7 miles (11 km) east of the city of Norwich.

History
Brundall's name is of Anglo-Saxon origin and likely derives from the Old English for a small area of dry land with an abundance of broom.

In the Domesday Book, Brundall is recorded as consisting of 70 households belonging to King William, Bishop William of Thetford and Gilbert the Bowman.

In 1874, Brundall was the location of the Thorpe rail accident, a major head-on collision between two railway locomotives which resulted in the deaths of 25 people.

In 1898, the boatbuilder, Brooms of Brundall, was established. This company has built high quality watercraft and operated water tours on the Broads for over one hundred years and is still in operation.

Geography
The civil parish has an area of 4.39 km2 and in the 2001 census had a population of 3,978 people in 1,681 households, increasing to a population of 4,019 in 1,765 households at the 2011 Census. 

For the purposes of local government, the parish falls within the district of Broadland. As in other broadland villages, the land lying directly adjacent to the river falls into the executive area of the Broads Authority.

Transport

St Laurence's Church
Brundall's Parish Church is a tower-less church dating from the 13th century and is dedicated to Saint Laurence. Furthermore, St Laurence's is home to East Anglia's only lead church font and the stained-glass windows were created by Clayton and Bell and Charles Eamer Kempe.

Notable Residents
 Robert Ashton- British historian
 Robert Blake- English historian and biographer
 Sam Clemmett- British actor
 Bruce Rushin- English art teacher and coin designer

War Memorial
Brundall's War Memorial takes the form of a stained glass window for the First World War and a marble plaque for the Second World War. The First World War memorial lists the following names:
 Second-Lieutenant Walter H. Benn (d.1917), 7th Battalion, Royal Norfolk Regiment
 Sub-Lieutenant Claude C. Sennitt (1892-1917), Hood Battalion, Royal Naval Division
 Corporal James H. Harper (1888-1918), 333rd (Siege) Battery, Royal Garrison Artillery
 Private Richard R. Minns (d.1918), 8th Battalion, Border Regiment
 Private James Holsworth (1897-1916), 1st Battalion, Royal Norfolk Regiment
 Private Herbert Smith (d.1918), 7th Battalion, Royal Norfolk Regiment
 Private Frank Smith (1896-1916), 8th Battalion, Royal Norfolk Regiment

And, the following for the Second World War:
 Pilot-Officer John H. Braybrooks (1912-1942), Royal Air Force
 Pilot-Officer Sidney C. Braybrooks (1885-1941), No. 224 Squadron RAF
 Lieutenant Austin S. Carruthers (1920-1945), Royal Army Medical Corps
 Leading-Aircraftman E. R. John Spooner (1922-1942), Royal Air Force
 Sergeant John R. Mace (1914-1943), No. 158 Squadron RAF
 Sergeant Wilfrid Jaques (1916-1943), 196th Field Ambulance, Royal Army Medical Corps
 Able-Seaman George W. Moorby (1906-1942), S.S. Glenlea
 Private Percy J. Horner (1920-1943), 4th Battalion, Royal Norfolk Regiment
 Private Stanley C. Cork (1920-1943), 5th Battalion, Royal Norfolk Regiment

References

Sources
 Ordnance Survey (2005). OS Explorer Map OL40 - The Broads. .
 Office for National Statistics & Norfolk County Council (2001).

External links 

.

Broadland
Villages in Norfolk
Civil parishes in Norfolk